Choi Jung-han  (Hangul: 최정한; born 3 June 1989, in Incheon) is a South Korean football forward who plays for Navy.

Career

Oita Trinita 
He started his professional football career in J1 League side Oita Trinita since 2009.

Choi made his debut on 3 October 2009 against Montedio Yamagata after coming on as a substitute at the 89 minute.

FC Seoul 
On 6 July 2014, he joined FC Seoul.

Club statistics

References

External links
 
 Oita Trinita official website profile 
 Choi Jung-Han at Yahoo! Japan 
 

1989 births
Living people
Association football forwards
South Korean footballers
South Korean expatriate footballers
Oita Trinita players
FC Seoul players
Daegu FC players
J1 League players
J2 League players
K League 1 players
K League 2 players
Expatriate footballers in Japan
South Korean expatriate sportspeople in Japan
Yonsei University alumni
Sportspeople from Incheon
South Korea under-20 international footballers
South Korea under-23 international footballers